Nymboida is a national park in New South Wales, Australia, 485 km north of Sydney.

Some of the possibilities are bird watching, camping, hiking, canoeing and swimming in the clear cold water of the Nimboida and Mann rivers. The average elevation of the terrain is 531 meters.

See also
 Protected areas of New South Wales
 High Conservation Value Old Growth forest

References

National parks of New South Wales
Protected areas established in 1980
1980 establishments in Australia